Géza Molnár (born 29 September 1953) is a Hungarian wrestler. He competed in the men's freestyle 90 kg at the 1976 Summer Olympics.

References

External links
 
 
 
 

1953 births
Living people
Hungarian male sport wrestlers
Olympic wrestlers of Hungary
Wrestlers at the 1976 Summer Olympics
Martial artists from Budapest